The Meekoceratidae is a family of ceratitid ammonites described in the Treatise on Invertebrate Paleontology, as being more or less involute, compressed, discoidal, smooth to weakly ornamented; venter arched or tabulate; sutures ceratitic with broad saddles. Now includes four subfamilies.

References

 
Noritoidea
Ceratitida families
Early Triassic first appearances
Middle Triassic extinctions